An annular solar eclipse will occur on October 14, 2088. A solar eclipse occurs when the Moon passes between Earth and the Sun, thereby totally or partly obscuring the image of the Sun for a viewer on Earth. An annular solar eclipse occurs when the Moon's apparent diameter is smaller than the Sun's, blocking most of the Sun's light and causing the Sun to look like an annulus (ring). An annular eclipse appears as a partial eclipse over a region of the Earth thousands of kilometres wide.

Related eclipses

Solar eclipses 2087–2090

Saros 135 

It is a part of Saros cycle 135, repeating every 18 years, 11 days, containing 71 events. The series started with partial solar eclipse on July 5, 1331. It contains annular eclipses from October 21, 1511 through February 24, 2305, hybrid eclipses on March 8, 2323 and March 18, 2341 and total eclipses from March 29, 2359 through May 22, 2449. The series ends at member 71 as a partial eclipse on August 17, 2593. The longest duration of totality will be 2 minutes, 27 seconds on May 12, 2431.

Tritos series

References

External links 

2088 10 14
2088 in science
2088 10 14
2088 10 14